Maglie (Griko: , translit.) is a town and comune in the province of Lecce in the Apulia region of south-east Italy.

History

The Maglie area was settled as early as the Bronze Age and the early Iron Age, and before, as testified by the presence of archaic dolmens and menhirs, and by the Cattìe site, discovered in 1980, and featuring 12,000 tools and 800 bone remains.

Maglie, initially a countryside casale, developed around the castle built in the 13th century, probably under the Angevine kings of Naples and later renewed by Andriolo Lubello, the local baron under king Alfonso I of Aragon.

Main sights
Duomo (Cathedral, also called Chiesa Collegiata). It was built in the late 18th century on the site of two previous buildings tracing back to 14th and 16th century. The four upper storeys are attributed to Giuseppe Zimbalo.
Church of Madonna delle Grazie, in Baroque style (early 16th century). The interior has a 1645 Baroque altar and 17th century canvasses. It also features a column, similar to the Lecce's Column of St. Oronzo by Zimbalo, built in 1684–87.
Church of Madonna Addolorata (18th century)
Palazzo Baronale

Economy
Maglie's economy is based on commerce, craftmanship (especially of local stone), and tourism.

Demographics
Population development since 1861:

Migrant communities in Maglie with more than ten people 01.01.2020:

Transportation
Maglie is served by the Ferrovie Sud Est Zollino-Gagliano and Maglie-Otranto lines.

It is crossed by two state roads, the SS16 Adriatica Lecce-Maglie-Otranto, and the SS275 from Santa Maria di Leuca.

People
Aldo Moro (1916-1978), politician

References

 
Localities of Salento